Dithecodes is a genus in the family Geometridae. Its type species, Dithecodes erasa, is found in Japan. Both the genus and species were first described by Warren in 1900.

Species
 Dithecodes erasa Warren, 1900 (Japan)
 Dithecodes brunneifrons (Hampson, 1909)
 Dithecodes delicata  (Warren, 1899)
 Dithecodes ornithospila (Prout L. B., 1911)
 Dithecodes purpuraria Joannis, 1932

References

www.afromoths.net

Rhodostrophiini
Monotypic moth genera